Rathenauplatz station is a Nuremberg U-Bahn station, located on the U2 and U3. The station is named for the nearby square which was in turn named for the assassinated industrial leader and foreign minister of Germany Walter Rathenau. A portrait of Rathenau adorns the walls of the station and there is also a portrait of the father of Zionism, Theodor Herzl. When traveling in a northerly direction, Rathenauplatz is the last station served by both U2 and U3 and it is therefore a busy interchange station.

References

Nuremberg U-Bahn stations
Railway stations in Germany opened in 1990
Buildings and structures completed in 1990
Walther Rathenau